Marc Cassot (1923–2016) was a French film and television actor.  He was also a prominent voice actor, dubbing foreign films for release in France.

Selected filmography
 Night Warning (1946)
 Les Amants du pont Saint-Jean (1947)
 A Certain Mister (1950)
 The Love of a Woman (1953)
 Service Entrance (1954)
 The Big Flag (1954)
 The Game of Truth (1961)
 Love Me Strangely (1971)
 Renaissance (2006)

References

Bibliography
Cowie, Peter & Elley, Derek . World Filmography: 1967. Fairleigh Dickinson University Press, 1977.
 Ince, Kate. Georges Franju. Manchester University Press, 2019.

External links

1923 births
2016 deaths
People from Paris
French male film actors
French male television actors